Bruce de la Coeur Hylton-Stewart (27 November 1891 – 1 October 1972) was a musician and schoolteacher who played first-class cricket for Somerset and Cambridge University between 1912 and 1914.

Born at New Brighton and brought up also in Cheshire, where his father Charles Henry Hylton Stewart was a minor canon of Chester Cathedral. Hylton-Stewart was educated at Bath College, then went up to Peterhouse, Cambridge, with an organ scholarship. He was a right-handed lower or middle order batsman and a right-arm fast-medium bowler.

He first appeared in first-class cricket in the Somerset match against the South Africans in 1912, when he replaced the injured Harry Chidgey after the game had started. Two weeks later, he made his only appearance of the 1912 season for Cambridge University, and then from mid-July appeared fairly regularly for Somerset for the rest of the season. His batting was not successful, but he had one sensational day as a bowler, taking five wickets for three runs in 14 balls against Worcestershire at Stourbridge: these remained the best bowling figures of his first-class cricket career.

In 1913, Hylton-Stewart played 11 first-class matches, most of them in the second half of the season and all of them for Somerset. He took five wickets in an innings for a second time, this time five for 72 against Yorkshire at Park Avenue, Bradford. His batting improved as well, and he made his first score of more than 50, an unbeaten 72 against Sussex at Bath.

The 1914 season was Hylton-Stewart's most successful as a batsman – he made 520 runs at an average of 20.80 per innings. After two matches for Cambridge in mid-season, he again played most of Somerset's matches in the second half of the year. Batting now in the middle order, he made his only first-class century, 110, made in 105 minutes out of an innings of 220, against Essex at Leyton. And late in the season, he made 91 against Worcestershire at Taunton.

During the First World War Hylton-Stewart was commissioned in the British Army and served with school Officers' Training Corps (OTC), first at The Leys School and then at Haileybury. He remained with the Haileybury OTC until 1929 when he resigned his commission.

Hylton-Stewart did not return to first-class cricket after the First World War but played Minor Counties cricket for Hertfordshire up to 1927.

Hylton-Stewart taught at Marlborough College 1934–54 and then was Director of Music and organist at St James's Church, Piccadilly, 1954–70. He died at Marlborough.

Note on spelling
Hylton-Stewart's surname is written without a hyphen in some non-cricketing references, regularly with a hyphen in cricketing references. Both his father and his older brother, Charles Hylton Stewart (1884–1932), who achieved fame as a composer of church music including settings for Psalms and as the organist at Rochester and Chester Cathedrals and at St George's Chapel, Windsor, are generally written without a hyphen.

Bruce Hylton-Stewart's middle name is also, in some references, spelled as "Delacour".

References

1891 births
1972 deaths
English cricketers
Somerset cricketers
Cambridge University cricketers
Hertfordshire cricketers
Alumni of Peterhouse, Cambridge
Officers' Training Corps officers
British Army personnel of World War I
Schoolteachers from Merseyside
English organists
British male organists
20th-century organists
20th-century British male musicians